The Hundred of Louth is a hundred within County of Flinders, South Australia. It is on the Eyre Peninsula and was proclaimed in 1857.

The traditional owners of the land are the Nauo peoples.

See also
 Lands administrative divisions of South Australia

References

Louth
l